Tony Miller is a former professional rugby league footballer who played in the 1960s and 1970s.

Playing career

County Cup Final appearances
Tony Miller played  in Castleford's 7-11 defeat by Hull Kingston Rovers in the 1971 Yorkshire County Cup Final during the 1971–72 season at Belle Vue, Wakefield on Saturday 21 August 1971.

References

External links
Search for "Miller" at rugbyleagueproject.org
Tony Miller Memory Box Search at archive.castigersheritage.com

Living people
Castleford Tigers players
English rugby league players
Rugby league hookers
Place of birth missing (living people)
Year of birth missing (living people)